Zelenograd (lit. green city) is a city and administrative okrug of Moscow, Russia. Zelenograd is the smallest administrative okrug of Moscow by area, one from bottom by population, and the largest Moscow exclave by area and population within Moscow Oblast. The city of Zelenograd, if it were a separate settlement, would be 5th largest city in Moscow Oblast and one of the 100 largest cities of Russia. Before the expansion of the territory of Moscow in 2012, Zelenograd occupied the second place among the administrative districts of Moscow, second only to the Eastern administrative district in terms of the share of greenery in the total area (~ 30%).

Zelenograd was founded in 1958 as a new town in the Soviet Union, developed as a center of electronics, microelectronics and the  computer industry known as "Soviet/Russian Silicon Valley", and remains an important center of electronics in modern Russia. The city color is green and its emblematic animal is the squirrel.

History
Zelenograd was founded in 1958 as an unnamed planned city near the village and railway station of Kryukovo on a previously empty, forested place, and its architecture and civic layout yields to one general architectural plan (chief architects Igor Rozhin (1956–1963), then Igor Pokrovsky (1963–2002)), which has appreciable influence from the garden city movement, the development of the Tapiola district in Finland, and new towns in the United Kingdom (Harlow and others).

The city was planned as a center of the textile industry initially, but in 1962, Alexander Shokin (Chairman of State Committee of Electronic Technology, then first Minister of Electronic Technology) proposed to change the line of future city business to electronics. Some researchers of Soviet electronics history mentioned that a similar idea was proposed to the Soviet government by two fugitive Silicon Valley engineers - Alfred Sarant (more known in Russia as Philip Staros) and Joel Barr (Joseph Berg).

On January 15, 1963 the city received official city status and name Zelenograd, and on November 25, 1968 Zelenograd received the status of district of Moscow (one of the 30 districts) simultaneously.

In 1988, Zelenograd incorporated the former village of Kryukovo, one of the important sites during the Battle of Moscow (October 1941 – January 1942). Several monuments to the Defenders of Moscow and the heroes of the Great Patriotic War are located in Zelenograd and the surrounding area, the most famous of which is the Shtyki Memorial, from which the remains of the Unknown Soldier were taken for reinterment at the Kremlin Wall in the Alexander Garden in Moscow.

Before 1989, Zelenograd was a de facto closed city in some aspects: it was prohibited to take photos in the central parts of the city, near the plants, teaching and research facilities, and foreigners were not admitted into the city.

In 1991, Zelenograd was reformed in one of the administrative okrugs of Moscow.

Geography
The Skhodnya River originates near the village of Alabushevo (one of settlements, which are under Zelenograd jurisdiction) and forms two ponds within the precincts of city - Small and Large City Pond.

Administrative divisions
Zelenogradsky Administrative Okrug is divided into five districts:
Matushkino, previously District #1: 1st, 2nd, and 4th microdistricts, North Industrial Zone
Savyolki, previously District #2: 3rd, 5th, 6th and 7th microdistricts, East Utility Zone, Nazar'evo village
Staroye Kryukovo, previously District #3: 8th and 9th microdistricts, South Industrial Zone, north part of Malino settlement
Silino, previously District #4: 10th, 11th, and 12th microdistricts, West and Alabushevo Industrial Zones
Kryukovo: 14th-23rd microdistricts (21st one is scheduled only), Andreevka Utility Zone, Malino Industrial Zone, south part of Malino settlement, Kamenka, Kutuzovo, Novo-Malino, and Rozhki villages

The first four districts (about 2/3 area and population) are unofficially formed Old City, and Kryukovo District (separated by Saint Petersburg – Moscow Railway) is unofficially named New City. The most of postal address in city has no name of street or square - the most of buildings have only 3- or 4-digit number: the first one or two digits are number of microdistrict, the last two ones are number of building within microdistrict borders. There is no 13th microdistrict in Zelenograd.

Economy

Industries

Zelenograd is home to the National Research University of Electronic Technology (MIET).

Zelenograd was the headquarters of Sitronics Concerne since its founding in 1997 until 2005 (when its headquarters moved to Moscow) and Zelenograd is the headquarters of Mikron and Angstrem - both largest Russian integrated circuit manufacturers.

Zelenograd is one of technical-innovative type Special economic zones. Since December 21, 2005 SEZ "Zelenograd" officially consists of 2 areas: Area "Alabushevo" (141.87 ha), a main area for new plants and research centers; and Area "MIET" (4.47 ha), a technology park (mostly MIET spin-off enterprises).

Sports
A local football team Zelenograd (nicknamed Zelyono-Belye, or Green-Whites) was founded in 2002 and in 2007-2010 had been playing in the Russian Second Division. A local rugby team Zelenograd was founded in 2006 and played in Russian Rugby Championship 2008 (but it could not get to Championship 2009).

Gallery

Sister cities
 Tulsa (Oklahoma, United States)
 Unterschleißheim (Bavaria, Germany)

Patronized ships
Landing ship Caesar Kunikov, Black Sea Fleet (since 1998)
Nuclear submarine , Pacific Ocean Fleet (1998–2010, retired)
Supply ship Berezina, Black Sea Fleet (1995–1997, retired)

References

External links

Official website of Zelenogradsky Administrative Okrug 

 
Administrative okrugs of Moscow
Populated places established in 1958
Naukograds
Cities and towns in Moscow (federal city)